Joseph Riddick "Ricky" Hendrick IV (April 2, 1980 – October 24, 2004) was an American stock car racing driver and partial owner at Hendrick Motorsports, a NASCAR team that his father Rick Hendrick founded. He was born in Charlotte, North Carolina, on April 2, 1980, and began his career in racing at the age of fifteen. He competed in both the Busch Series and Craftsman Truck Series before his death from an airplane accident on October 24, 2004. He was killed with seven other family members and friends during the accident.

Racing career
Hendrick began his career in auto racing at the age of 15 by racing in the Legends Series Summer Shootout. In 1998, he received his first win on May 23, and earned his first pole position on July 18. One year later, he entered the NASCAR Busch Series at Myrtle Beach Speedway, where he qualified fifth and finished 20th.

Hendrick continued to run the series in 2000, with the addition of competing in the NASCAR Craftsman Truck Series piloting the No. 17 GMAC/Quaker State Chevrolet Silverado. While running races in the No. 24 Busch Series car, he was involved in multiple accidents and suffered from concussions. 

In 2001, he started to compete in all the Truck races. He recorded his first NASCAR career win at Kansas Speedway on July 7, becoming the youngest rookie to win a race. Hendrick was also able to accomplish 19 top ten finishes, the most by a rookie at that time. However, at the end of the season, he finished second in the Rookie of the Year Standings, with Travis Kvapil winning the award.

In 2002, he moved to the Busch Series with crew chief Lance McGrew driving the No. 5 GMAC Financial Chevrolet Monte Carlo. Hendrick suffered an accident in the third race of the season at Las Vegas Motor Speedway that resulted in a broken shoulder. He required surgery and missed 3 months of racing before he returned in May and finished 15th at Richmond. Hendrick decided to retire from driving in October of the same year. He continued to be employed by Hendrick Motorsports, as the owner of two teams: Brian Vickers in the Nextel Cup Series and Kyle Busch in the Busch Series. Hendrick also founded a motorcycle dealership in Pineville, North Carolina, named Ricky Hendrick's Performance Honda.

Death

On October 24, 2004, around 12:30 p.m. EDT, Hendrick died in a plane crash near Martinsville, Virginia, killing him and nine others. The plane, on its way to the Martinsville Speedway for the Subway 500, crashed on Bull Mountain due to pilot error in heavy fog.

After Hendrick died, his fiancée Emily Maynard learned that she was pregnant. Maynard gave birth to their daughter, Josephine Riddick "Ricki" Hendrick, on June 29, 2005, naming the girl after her late fiancé.

Motorsports career results

NASCAR
(key) (Bold – Pole position awarded by qualifying time. Italics – Pole position earned by points standings or practice time. * – Most laps led.)

Busch Series

Craftsman Truck Series

References

External links
 
 

1980 births
2004 deaths
Accidental deaths in Virginia
NASCAR drivers
NASCAR team owners
Racing drivers from Charlotte, North Carolina
Victims of aviation accidents or incidents in the United States
Victims of aviation accidents or incidents in 2004
Hendrick Motorsports drivers